Transmembrane protein 104 (TMEM104) is a protein that in humans is encoded by the TMEM104 gene. The aliases of TMEM104 are FLJ00021 and FLJ20255. Humans have a 163,255 base pair long gene coding sequence, 4703 base pair long mRNA, and 496 amino acid long protein sequence. In Eukaryotes, the TMEM104 gene is conserved.

Gene

Location 
TMEM104 is located on human chromosome 17 at the locus 17q25.1. TMEM104 is located between the genes NAT9 and GRIN2C.

Transcripts 
There are 7 main transcription variants: isoform 1, isoform 2, variant X1 - X5. TMEM104 is predicted to have a promoter region 150 base pairs upstream of the start of transcription. The promoter region of Homo sapien TMEM104 compared to other organisms is very unconserved. It was hard to find anything outside of Mammalia species and most were found under Primates.

Tissue expression 
In most human tissues, TMEM104 has a modest expression level (25–50th percentile), relative to all human proteins, according to RNA-seq data.

Subcelluar expression 
The protein has been located primarily in the plasma membrane and less so found in nucleus.

Immunochemistry Data 
Thermofisher claims that it exhibits significant nuclear and cytoplasmic positivity in glandular cells. With the aid of a TMEM104 polyclonal antibody, the samples were probed.

Protein 

TMEM104 variant 1 protein is 496 amino acids in length. TMEM104 is a secreted protein that is overexpressed in Adrenal. TMEM104 is a phenylalanine enriched and glutamine poor protein.

Characteristics 
TMEM104 has an isoelectric point of 6.8 and a molecular weight of 55.7 kdaltons. It is predicted to have between nine to eleven transmembrane domains, making it a transmembrane protein.

Post Translation Modifications 
The post-translational modifications N-glycosylation, sulfonation, and phosphorylation are among those predicted for TMEM104.

Tertiary structure 
TMEM104 has a tertiary structure with alpha helices and beta sheets.

Interaction 

TMEM104 has been shown to interact with CASKIN2, TMEM94, TOMM6, SYNGR3, SYTL5, B3GNT8, NTRK3, C15orf39, and PPSIG.

Homology

Ortholog 
TMEM104 has no paralogs. TMEM protein is found mostly in Eukaryotes.

The orthologs in the following table were discovered through BLAST searches. Although by no means exhaustive, this list demonstrates the enormous variety of organisms that include TMEM104 orthologs.

References 

Uncharacterized proteins